The Back River is a small tidal estuary in Bourne, Massachusetts on the eastern shore of Buzzards Bay. It lies just south of the Cape Cod Canal near the village of Monument Beach. It is separated from Buzzards Bay by Phinneys Harbor.

Since 1989 the Back River has been listed as an Area of Critical Environmental Concern by the Commonwealth of Massachusetts.

See also
Pocasset River

References

External links
Massachusetts Estuaries Project - Back River

Estuaries of Massachusetts
Estuaries of Barnstable County, Massachusetts